Saint Saturninus of Cagliari is venerated as the patron saint of Cagliari.  According to Christian tradition, Saturninus was a local martyr –that is, he was killed at Cagliari by order of governor Barbarus.  The legend states that he was beheaded for refusing to offer sacrifices to Jupiter during the persecutions of Christians by Diocletian.

However, some scholars have determined that this tradition was invented centuries after the supposed martyrdom, and that the legend was devised a posteriori to attach a story to the name to whom the local ancient basilica was dedicated. But the name of the saint in Sardinian language, "Santu Sadurru" (Saint Saturnus) suggests that there really was the martyrdom of Saturnus, a young Christian by the pagans and the saint was exactly buried where the ancient church was erected. 

Saint Saturninus was so confused with Saturninus of Toulouse (Sernin).  "Saturninus" was the name of several other martyrs, including some belonging to the group of the Martyrs of Abitina, and close trading ties and communications between North Africa and Cagliari may have resulted in the cult of a North African saint becoming attached to this Sardinian location.

References

External links
Saturninus of Cagliari
 San Saturnino di Cagliari

Cagliari
4th-century Christian martyrs
4th-century Romans
Year of birth unknown